Travemünde is a borough of Lübeck, Germany, located at the mouth of the river Trave in Lübeck Bay. It began life as a fortress built by Henry the Lion, Duke of Saxony, in the 12th century to guard the mouth of the Trave, and the Danes subsequently strengthened it. It became a town in 1317 and in 1329 passed into the possession of the free city of Lübeck, to which it has since belonged. Its fortifications were demolished in 1807.

Travemünde has been a seaside resort since 1802, and is Germany's largest ferry port on the Baltic Sea with connections to Sweden, Finland, Russia, Latvia and Estonia. The lighthouse is the oldest on the German Baltic coast, dating from 1539. Another attraction of Travemünde is the Flying P-Liner Passat, a museum ship anchored in the mouth of the Trave.

The annual Travemünder Woche is a traditional sailing race week in Northern Europe. The annual Sand festival in Travemünde is known as the Sand World.

Literature
The 19th century seaside resort was evoked by Thomas Mann in Buddenbrooks. In Part II/5-12 the vacation of Antonie Buddenbrook is told, while in Part X/3 one summer of little Hanno. Travemünde is depicted by Mann as a place of freedom, happiness and - in the case of Antonie - love, in contrast with the problems of everyday life.

Photo gallery

Notable people 

 Ida Boy-Ed (1852–1928 in Travemünde) a German writer, supporter of women's issues, she wrote widely-read books and newspaper articles
 Friedrich Naumann (1860–1919 in Travemünde) a German liberal politician and Protestant parish pastor
 Otto Ciliax (1891–1964 in Travemünde) an admiral during WW2, served in the navies of the German Empire, the Weimar Republic and Nazi Germany
 Lilo Peters (1913–2001 in Travemünde) a North German painter and sculptor.
 Peter Nogly (born 1947 in Travemünde) a German football coach and a former player
 Rötger Feldmann (born 1950 in Travemünde) a German comic book artist, created the character Werner 
 Torsten Wohlert (born 1965 in Travemünde) a German former footballer

References

External links

 Travemünde
 Official tourism site
 Travemünde Panoramas
 Travemünde related Photography Blog
 Historical footage of Travemünde, 1919, filmportal.de

Lübeck
Seaside resorts in Germany
Port cities and towns in Germany
Port cities and towns of the Baltic Sea
Populated coastal places in Germany (Baltic Sea)
12th-century establishments in the Holy Roman Empire
Populated places established in the 12th century
Bay of Lübeck